Litla-Hraun ("Little Lava") is the largest prison in Iceland. Located just outside Eyrarbakki, it consists of nine buildings inside a high-security fence.

Litla-Hraun was founded on March 8, 1929, as a single building. Inside the fence is a football field as well as some basketball facilities. Work programs include the making of license plates and car washing. Inmates get paid for their work according to a fixed rate set by the Prison and probation administration of Iceland.

References
Fangelsið Litla-Hrauni

Prisons in Iceland
1929 establishments in Iceland